The Rationalists is a 1988 book by the philosopher John Cottingham, in which the author offers an overview of the most important exponents of rationalism, namely René Descartes, Baruch Spinoza and Gottfried Wilhelm Leibniz. Other thinkers, such as Nicolas Malebranche, are also dealt with.

1988 non-fiction books
Books by John Cottingham
Contemporary philosophical literature
English-language books
English non-fiction books
Oxford University Press books
Philosophy books
Rationalism